Toronto Business Development Centre (TBDC) is a non-profit organization in  City of Toronto, Ontario, Canada.  Its mandate is to nurture the growth of new and emerging businesses.  As a business incubator, TBDC assists entrepreneurs in navigating the challenging road of starting and developing a new business. It offers entrepreneurial training programs, business seminars and business networking opportunities. TBDC is a member of the Canadian Association of Business Incubation (CABI).

History
The centre is an initiative of the city of Toronto and the Ontario Ministry of Economic Development of Trade in 1990.

References
 Strategis (Industry Canada) listing
 Toronto Economic Development Corporation listing

External links
 Toronto Business Development Centre website

Economic Development and Culture